"Over Drive" is a song performed by the Japanese band Garnet Crow for the original soundtrack to the 2010 anime film Detective Conan: The Lost Ship in the Sky. The song was produced by Hirohito Furui and written by Azuki Nana and Yuri Nakamura. It was released on April 14, 2010 as the lead single from the soundtrack album. "Over Drive" will also appear as one track on Garnet Crow's eighth studio album, Parallel Universe.

Background
"Over Drive"'s lyrics were written by Azuki Nana alongside Yuri Nakamura, who created the melody, and produced by Hirohito Furui for the fourteenth Detective Conan movie, Detective Conan: The Lost Ship in the Sky. The song was released as the theme song and played over the film's end credits.

Chart performance
"Over Drive" made its chart debut on the official Oricon Monthly Singles Chart and Oricon Daily Singles Chart at number four and three respectively on the issue dated April 14, 2010. It has sold a total of 13,823 copies in Japan. "Over Drive" has reached the highest rank on the Oricon chart of any of the band's singles thus far.

Track listing
These are the formats and track listings of major single releases of "Over Drive".

Digital Download
"Over Drive" – 4:27
"la-la-la それから1・2・3" - 4:46

CD single
"Over Drive" – 4:27
"la-la-la それから1・2・3" - 4:46
"Over Drive" (Instrumental) - 4:27

DVD single
"Over Drive" – 4:27
"la-la-la それから1・2・3" - 4:46
"Over Drive" (Instrumental) - 4:27
As the Dew -Director's Cut

Credits and personnel
Songwriting – Azuki Nana, Yuri Nakamura
Production – Hirohito Furui

Charts and certifications

Charts

Sales and certifications

Release history

References

External links
GARNET CROW's official website 
GIZA studio's website 

2009 songs
2010 singles
Garnet Crow songs
Case Closed songs
Japanese film songs
Songs written for animated films
Songs with lyrics by Nana Azuki